China (Guangzhou) International Automobile Exhibition, also called Guangzhou International Motor Show or Auto Guangzhou, is an auto show held by Guangzhou Zhanlian Exhibition Service Co., Ltd, in November and December every year in the Guangzhou International Convention and Exhibition Center, China. It is not a recognized international show by the Organisation Internationale des Constructeurs d'Automobiles.

History

2002–2018 
In 2006, the Nissan Livina Geniss made its world premiere.

2010 saw the Trumpchi introduced. In 2011, it was held from November 22 until November 28. That year saw Changan Automobile, based in Chongqing, showing four new models, including its new Changan Eado compact, and a new subcompact the B501. Other entrants included the redesigned BenBen Mini, and Changan's new BlueCore brand. The 2012 Guangzhou International Motor Show opened on November 22, 2012, debuting cars such as the 2014 Subaru Forester that year.

2019 
At the 17th Guangzhou International Motor Show on November 22, 2019, a Tesla Model 3 that was manufactured in China was showcased. The 2019 event started with the world premiere of the Mercedes-Maybach GLS.  Lexus also unveiled its first all-electric vehicle that year, the UX 300e. The Chevrolet Menlo EV debuted as well.

2020 
The 18th Guangzhou International Automobile Exhibition was held from November 20 until November 29, 2020 at the China Import and Export Fair Complex. It had the world premieres of the Bugatti Bolide, BYD D1 and Qin Plus, Changan UNI-K, Hyundai Mistra, Infiniti QX55, Kia Sportage Ace, Leapmotor C11, Mercedes-Maybach S class, MG 5, Roewe R-Aura concept, Toyota Allion, Toyota Lingshang, Volkswagen ID.4 X and Crozz.

2021 
The 2021 Auto Guangzhou was held from 11 to 28 November in 2021. Debuts include the Aion LX Plus, Audi A8 L Horch, Audi Q5 e-Tron, Genesis Electrified GV70, GWM King Kong, Honda Integra, Lincoln Zephyr, Maxus Mifa 9, Mitsubishi Airtrek, Voyah Dreamer, and XPeng G9.

2022 
The 2022 Auto Guangzhou was postponed from the original November 2022 date to December 30, 2022. Running until January 8, 2023.

Production cars: 
 Aion Hyper GT
 Changan Yida
 Chery Tiggo 9
 GAC GS3
 GWM Shanhai Cannon
 Haval H-Dog
 Hongqi H6
 Hycan V09
 IAT T-Mad
 Jidu Robo-01
 Jidu Robo-02
 Tank 300 Cyber Knight and Iron Cavalry 02 special editions
 Tank 500 PHEV
 Wey Lanshan DHT-PHEV

Exhibits 
The types of exhibits held include:
China (Guangzhou) International Automobile Exhibition: Passenger vehicles
Guangzhou International Electric Vehicle Show: Electric vehicles
Guangzhou International Commercial Vehicle Exhibition: Commercial vehicles
Guangzhou International Auto Part & Accessories Exhibition: Automotive parts

See also 
List of auto shows and motor shows by continent
Automobile industry in China
Auto Shanghai

References

External links 

 Auto Guangzhou

Auto shows in China
Automotive industry in China
Annual events in China
Guangzhou
Economy of Guangzhou